Larry Sultan (July 13, 1946 – December 13, 2009) was an American photographer from the San Fernando Valley in California. He taught at the San Francisco Art Institute from 1978 to 1988 and at the California College of the Arts in San Francisco 1989 to 2009. 

Sultan's books include Evidence (1977) with Mike Mandel, Pictures From Home (1992) and The Valley (2004). A recipient of a Guggenheim Fellowship, his work is exhibited in museums in the United States.

Life and work
Sultan was born on July 13, 1946 in Brooklyn, New York to a Jewish family. He grew up in the San Fernando Valley, near Los Angeles, California, where his parents moved when he was an infant. He graduated from the University of California, Santa Barbara with a bachelor's degree in political science, and received a master's degree in fine arts from the San Francisco Art Institute in San Francisco.

He started his career in the 1970s as a conceptual photographer. In 1977, he published a collection of photographs he found in corporate and government archives called Evidence with fellow photographer Mike Mandel. The New York Times characterized Evidence as "a watershed in the history of art photography." The two men also created billboards aimed at slowing down road traffic. He then published Pictures From Home, a collection of photographs taken of his parents in the San Fernando Valley from 1982 to 1992, whose role was to question societal expectations of gender and aging. His 2004 assignment for Maxim, which consisted of photographs of middle-class residences rented by the porn industry in the San Fernando Valley, led to another photographic series called The Valley. He photographed Paris Hilton for Interview in his parents' bedroom in his childhood home.

Sultan was an instructor of photography at his alma mater, the San Francisco Art Institute, from 1978 to 1988. He then taught at the California College of the Arts in San Francisco as Chair of the Photography Department from 1993 to 1999, and as distinguished professor of art from 1989 to 2009.

He served on the board of trustees of the Headlands Center for the Arts from 1992 to 1998. At the time of his death he was the artist trustee at San Francisco Museum of Modern Art, a position he had taken up in the same year.

He was married to Katherine Sultan, also known as Kelly Sultan. He died of cancer on December 13, 2009 at his home in Greenbrae, California.

Publications

Awards

1976: Art in Public Places grant, National Endowment for the Arts. With Mike Mandel
1977: Photographer’s Fellowship, National Endowment for the Arts. With Mike Mandel
1980: Photographer’s Fellowship, National Endowment for the Arts
1983: Guggenheim Fellowship from the John Simon Guggenheim Memorial Foundation
1986: Photographer’s Fellowship, National Endowment for the Arts
1990: Fleishhacker Foundation Eureka Fellowship
1991: Biennial Award, The Louis Comfort Tiffany Foundation
1992: Photographer’s Fellowship, National Endowment for the Arts

Exhibitions

Solo exhibitions
2012–2013: Larry Sultan's Homeland: American Story, Amon Carter Museum of American Art, Fort Worth, TX, October 2012 – January 2013.
2014–2015: Larry Sultan: Here and Home, Los Angeles County Museum of Art (LACMA), Los Angeles, CA, November 2014 – May 2015; Milwaukee Art Museum, Milwaukee, WI, October 2015 - January 2016.
2014–2015: Larry Sultan, Stedelijk Museum voor Actuele Kunst, Ghent, Belgium, March-May 2015.

Group exhibitions
1989: Real Fictions: Recent Color Photographs by Bill Dane, John Harding and Larry Sultan, San Francisco Museum of Modern Art. With Bill Dane and John Harding, curated by Sandra S. Phillips.
2011–2012: Here, Pier 24 Photography, San Francisco, CA, May 2011 – January 2012.
2012–2013: About Face, Pier 24 Photography, San Francisco, CA, May 2012 – April 2013.
2014–2015 Secondhand, Pier 24 Photography, San Francisco, CA, August 2014 – May 2015.

Collections
Sultan's work is held in the following permanent collections:
Art Institute of Chicago, Chicago, IL: 33 prints (as of January 2021)
Pier 24 Photography, San Francisco, CA
San Francisco Museum of Modern Art, San Francisco, CA
Solomon R. Guggenheim Museum, New York City
Tate Modern, London
Whitney Museum of American Art, New York City

See also
Pictures From Home, a play written by Sharr White based on the book

References

External links

Photographs in the SFMOMA collection

1946 births
2009 deaths
Artists from Brooklyn
People from the San Fernando Valley
People from Greenbrae, California
University of California, Santa Barbara alumni
San Francisco Art Institute alumni
Photographers from California
California College of the Arts faculty
Artists from the San Francisco Bay Area
Deaths from cancer in California
Photographers from New York City
20th-century American photographers
20th-century American male artists
21st-century American photographers
21st-century American male artists